Elbay Gasimzade (born December 26, 1948) is an Azerbaijani architect, Honored Architect of the Azerbaijan SSR, Chairman of the Union of Architects of Azerbaijan.

Biography 
Elbay Gasimzade was born on December 26, 1948, in Baku. He graduated from the architectural faculty of Azerbaijan Technical University in 1971.

In 1971-1975 he worked on the problems of landscape architecture, natural landscape, harmonization of buildings raised in different districts of Baku, etc. In 1976, he was engaged in urban planning problems at the graduate school of the Institute of Architecture and Art of the Azerbaijan Academy of Sciences.

From 1989 to 2001 he worked as the chief architect of Baku, the chief of the Main Department of Architecture and Urban Planning of the Baku City Executive Power. Elbay Gasimzade is a professor at the Faculty of Architecture of the Azerbaijan University of Architecture and Construction. He is the architect of Azadliq prospekti metro station.

He founded the architectural company El & En in 1998 and still heads it. He is the author of more than 150 projects, more than 80 articles and 8 books.

Elbay Gasimzadeh is a full member and vice-president of the International Academy of Oriental Architecture, professor of the International Academy of Architecture (UNESCO) and the International Union of Architects (UIA). He has repeatedly participated in international competitions "The best project (construction) of the year" held by the Association of Unions of Architects of the CIS countries and was awarded 34 diplomas. He was elected the first chairman of the Council of Chief Architects of the CIS capitals. Participates in World Congresses in Chicago, Barcelona, Lausanne, Beijing, Turin and Tokyo.

Awards 
 Honored Architect of the Azerbaijan SSR — 1990
 Shohrat Order — April 19, 2000
 Sharaf Order — December 25, 2018
 Humay Award (3 times)
 Ughur Award (2 times)

References 

20th-century Azerbaijani architects
1948 births
Living people
Recipients of the Azerbaijan Democratic Republic 100th anniversary medal
21st-century Azerbaijani architects